Romborama is the debut studio album by Italian electronic duo The Bloody Beetroots. It was released on August 21, 2009. Some tracks are taken from earlier Bloody Beetroots releases, for example "Butter" can also be found on the Rombo EP.

The track "Warp 1.9" reached number 23 on the Triple J Hottest 100, 2009, the world's largest music poll. The track "Butter" was featured in a commercial for season 2 of MTV's Jersey Shore and in Fifa 09 

To date Romborama has sold over 2,000,000 copies.

Track listing
"Romborama" (featuring All Leather) - 3:43
"Have Mercy on Us" (featuring Cécile) - 5:48
"Storm" - 3:43
"Awesome" (featuring The Cool Kids) - 2:33
"Cornelius" - 4:13
"It's Better a DJ on 2 Turntables" - 3:48
"Talkin' in My Sleep" (featuring Lisa Kekaula) - 5:29
"Second Streets Have No Name" (featuring Beta Bow) - 3:04
"Butter" - 4:35
"WARP 1.9" (featuring Steve Aoki) - 3:23
"FFA 1985" (featuring Sky Ferreira) - 3:23
"Theolonius" (King Voodoo) - 4:51
"Yeyo" (featuring Raw Man) - 3:32 
"Little Stars" (featuring Vicarious Bliss) - 2:42
"WARP 7.7" (featuring Steve Aoki) - 3:57
"Make Me Blank" (featuring J*Davey) - 3:52
"House No. 84" - 3:53
"Mother" - 3:38
"I Love the Bloody Beetroots" - 5:32
"Anacletus" - 3:17
"Come La" (featuring Marracash) (bonus track) - 2:42
"Little Stars" (featuring Vicarious Bliss (Instrumental)) (bonus track) - 2:41

The song "It's Better a DJ on 2 Turntables" was secretly released unfinished under the alias of 'The Bollocks Brothers'.

References

The Bloody Beetroots albums
2009 debut albums